CFCH-FM (defunct) was a Canadian community radio station, broadcasting at 103.5 FM in Chase, British Columbia. It was last owned by the Chase and District Community Radio Society.

History
On October 6, 2004, the CRTC approved the Chase and District Lions Community Club's application to operate an English-language developmental community FM radio station, broadcasting at 103.5 MHz with an effective radiated power of 4.7 watts. The station commenced broadcasting in 2005.

Ownership was transferred to the Chase and District Community Radio Society in 2007.

On August 1, 2008, The CRTC approved the Radio Society's application for a regular, English-language, low-power Type B community FM radio station at 103.5 MHz (channel 278LP) with an effective radiated power of 19.7 watts.

CFCH-FM ceased broadcasting on August 31, 2014, citing lack of support for the community station. The group applied to the CRTC to revoke their broadcasting license, which was approved October 14, 2014.

CFCH Call sign History

CFCH was a former call sign used at a radio station in North Bay, Ontario, known today as CKFX-FM. On May 25, 2020, Vista Radio, who owns CFXN-FM, was approved to operate a new FM radio station at North Bay and is reusing the heritage CFCH call sign in that city. Vista launched the new radio station with the CFCH-FM call sign in North Bay on June 15, 2021.

See also
 RWSfm 103.3: Former Lions radio station in England
 Walsall Hospital Radio: Current Lions radio station in England

References

External links
 CFCH - archived website 
 
  - Call sign now belongs to a radio station in North Bay, Ontario in 2021.

FCH
FCH
Lions Clubs International
Radio stations established in 2005
2005 establishments in British Columbia
2014 disestablishments in British Columbia
Radio stations disestablished in 2014
Fch
FCH-FM